Natalino Pescarolo (26 March 1929 – 4 January 2015) was an Italian Roman Catholic bishop.

Ordained to the priesthood on 29 June 1952, Pescarolo was named auxiliary bishop of the Diocese of Cuneo in Italy in 1990. In 1992, he was appointed bishop of Fossano and in 1999, he was also appointed bishop of Cuneo.

Pescarolo retired in 2005 and died in 2015.

Notes

1929 births
2015 deaths
20th-century Italian Roman Catholic bishops
21st-century Italian Roman Catholic bishops
People from Palestro